Ayanah Moor (born 1973, Norfolk, Virginia, United States) is a conceptual artist working in print, video, mixed media, and performance. Her work addresses contemporary popular culture by interrogating identity and vernacular aesthetics. Much of her works center on hip-hop culture, American politics, black vernacular and gender performance.

Education and teaching
Moor received an MFA in printmaking from Tyler School of Art, Temple University, Philadelphia, PA 1998 and a BFA in painting and printmaking from Virginia Commonwealth University, Richmond, Virginia in 1995.

Moor is presently an Associate Professor in the Department of Printmedia, at School of the Art Institute of Chicago, Chicago, IL. Her prior appointment was at Carnegie Mellon University, Pittsburgh, PA.

With regards to her role as an educator, Moor “would like young artists to trust their own voice more, and not look for their work to be praised by their elders as much. Sometimes it’s disheartening to hear students say they don’t know what to think about something, and always looking for a ‘right’ answer. I want younger artists to recognize their value, and express themselves accordingly“.

Artworks
She appropriates and revises existing material to invert and expand meaning. "My work explores the way popular culture is an articulation of our desires, our fears, our fantasies," Moor has explained. "I think I have always been sensitive to the need to self-define, because black people in America have historically been affected by the ways in which others have defined them. For me, to revise: is to act upon a history. It is both an acknowledgement of history, a critique of it, and an alternative view. I am intrigued by the social constructs of race, just as I am intrigued by gender and sexuality. In my work I often play upon notions that we think of as fixed, to invite new definitions."

Selected projects
She exhibited her work alongside Krista Franklin at the Produce Mode Gallery in Chicago in 2017, in a show entitled Quiet Storm. In 2015, Moor's collaboration with Jasmine Hearn was included in Flow at the Studio Museum in Harlem.  Flow was the fourth in the F-Series exhibitions at the Studio Museum.  The piece is a performance artwork that translates drawing into sound and sound into movement. Flow is a response to the 1982 collaboration of Bill T. Jones and Keith Haring, Long Distance.
Thanks For The Race [2014]: Thanks For The Race (with various participants), performance work incorporating wood, mats, rocks; ACRE Residency, Steuben, WI 
Queer & Brown in Steeltown [2013-12]: (collaboration with Raquel Rodriguez) podcast & blog project 
The Pittsburgh Passion Project, Independent Women's Football League [2009]: Pittsburgh, PA 
Still [2006]: "Still" is a series of photographs that address how women are represented in contemporary rap music videos

Awards
In 2015 Ayanah Moor received a Hyde Park Art Center Jackman Goldwasser Residency, Chicago, IL.
In 2014 she received The Pittsburgh Foundation, Advancing Black Arts in Pittsburgh Award ($7,500).  In 2011 she was awarded a STUDIO for Creative Inquiry fellowship at Carnegie Mellon University. In 2011 The Pittsburgh Foundation awarded Moor an Advancing Black Arts in Pittsburgh Award. In 2003 she received a Mid Atlantic Arts Foundation—Creative Fellowship Award and The Pittsburgh Foundation, Artist Award, Pittsburgh, PA. In 2002 Moor was awarded a Berkman Faculty Development Fund Grant, Carnegie Mellon University.

Permanent collections
Ayanah Moor has work in the following collections: Soho House Art Collection, 76 Dean Street, London, UK, Milton and Nancy Washington, Pittsburgh, PA, Proyecto ‘ace, Buenos Aires, Argentina, Agency of Unrealized Projects, e-flux and Serpentine Gallery, London, UK, Bernard A. Zuckerman Museum of Art, Kennesaw, GA, The Block Museum of Art, Northwestern University, Evanston, IL, Mid Atlantic Arts Foundation, Baltimore, MD, Erie Art Museum, Erie, PA, David L. Lawrence Convention Center, Pittsburgh, PA, Foreland Street Studio Archives, Pittsburgh, PA, EGRESS Press and Research Archives, Edinboro, PA, Blue Mountain Center, Blue Mountain Lake, NY Brandywine Workshop, Philadelphia, PA, Tyler School of Art, Philadelphia, PA

Selected solo exhibitions 
2013 Ayanah Moor, Welch Galleries, Georgia State University, Atlanta, GA  
2012 New Drawings, Braddock Carnegie Library, Braddock, PA 
2011 Shift : Cambio, Poliglota Room, Proyecto ‘ace, Buenos Aires, Argentina 
2011 Good News, 707 Penn Gallery, Pittsburgh, PA 
2009 Souljah Sotomayor, Urban Institute for Contemporary Arts, Grand Rapids, MI 
2007 (W)RAPPER, Kipp Gallery, Indiana University of Pennsylvania, Indiana, PA 
2007 Our Radio is Bigger than Yours, Rice Gallery, McDaniel College, Westminster, MD 
2006 Still, Jewett Art Center, Wellesley College, Wellesley, MA 
2006 Still, John Hope Franklin Center, Duke University, Durham, NC
2005 Ayanah Moor, A+D 11th Street Gallery, Columbia College, Chicago, IL 
2003 A to Z Like Me, Anchor Graphics, Chicago, IL 
2003 Recent Work, Women's Studio Workshop Gallery, Rosendale, NY

References

American conceptual artists
American multimedia artists
American performance artists
American video artists
1973 births
Living people
African-American contemporary artists
American contemporary artists
African-American women artists
American women performance artists
American women video artists
Women conceptual artists
Temple University Tyler School of Art alumni
Virginia Commonwealth University alumni
Artists from Norfolk, Virginia
20th-century American women artists
21st-century American women artists
20th-century American artists
21st-century American artists
African-American women musicians
20th-century African-American women
20th-century African-American people
20th-century African-American artists
21st-century African-American women
21st-century African-American artists